The Labour Office of the Apostolic See is responsible for labour relations of the Holy See and Vatican City State with its employees. The office also settles labour issues which arise. It was instituted by Pope John Paul II on 1 January 1989.

Presidents of the Labour Office of the Apostolic See 
 Jan Pieter Schotte, C.I.C.M. (14 April 1989 – 10 January 2005) 
 Francesco Marchisano (5 February 2005 – 3 July 2009)
 Giorgio Corbellini (3 July 2009 – 13 November 2019)
 Alejandro W. Bunge (1 October 2020 – 26 January 2022)
 Giuseppe Sciacca (26 January 2022 – present)

Vice-Presidents of the Labour Office of the Apostolic See 
 Giovanni De Andrea (16 August 1989 – 13 October 2007)
 Franco Croci (13 October 2007 – 1 January 2010)

References

 
Government of Vatican City
Labor relations boards